Walter Michael Bortz II (born March 20, 1930) is an American physician and author who teaches medicine at Stanford University. He conducts research on aging and promotes the possibility of a 100-year lifespan.

Education
Bortz attended the Episcopal Academy of Philadelphia in 1947. He graduated from Williams College with a B.A. cum laude in 1951 and graduated from the University of Pennsylvania School of Medicine in 1955.

Career
Bortz is a former co-chairman of the American Medical Association's Task Force on Aging, past President of The American Geriatrics Society and is Chairman of the Medical Advisory Board for the Diabetes Research and Wellness Foundation.

His research focuses on the importance of physical exercise during the process of aging. Bortz has written 150 scientific articles for research publications such as JAMA, Annals of Internal Medicine, and Journal of Biological Chemistry, as well as articles in The New York Times, Washington Post, San Francisco Chronicle, The New England Journal of Medicine, American Journal of Public Health, and Town & Country.

He has written eight books including We Live Too Short and Die Too Long, Dare to be 100, Living Longer for Dummies, Diabetes Danger, Next Medicine, and Occupy Medicine.  he was working on his ninth, tentatively titled Aging is Negotiable.

Personal life 
Bortz is the son of Ed Bortz, former president of the American Medical Association. Bortz lives in Portola Valley, California. He has four children and nine grandchildren.

A runner for several decades, Bortz runs over 10 miles per week and has finished in over 30 marathons, including the New York and Boston marathons.

Awards
 Paavo Nurmi Award, Runners World Magazine 1986
 University of California, San Francisco - Institute for Health & Aging, Distinguished Leadership Award 1990
 Kenneth Cooper Award for Scientific Contribution to Active Living George Sheehan Award - National Fitness Leader's Association 1996
 American Society on Aging, Presidential Award 2002
 Avenidas Lifetime Achievement Award, Palo Alto, CA 2007

References

External links
 Bortz's website
 Factsheet on Walter Bortz
 Palo Alto Online article
 Stanford University podcast with Walter Bortz (April 29, 2011)

Williams College alumni
Perelman School of Medicine at the University of Pennsylvania alumni
American geriatricians
1930 births
Living people
People from Portola Valley, California